Mixing Me is a 2005 EP by Miss Kittin to promote her album I Com. Mixing Me contains remixes of I Com'''s singles.

 Critical reception 

Johnny Loftus of Allmusic said, "Mixing Me'' is a fantastic Miss Kittin entry point. She splices parts of later tracks into the earlier ones for more adventure."

Track listing

References 

2005 EPs
Miss Kittin albums